Magdalena Olsson (born 1990) is a Swedish orienteering and ski orienteering competitor.

She won a silver medal in the sprint at the 2019 World Ski Orienteering Championships.

References

1990 births
Living people
Swedish orienteers
Ski-orienteers